The 1989–90 Los Angeles Kings season, was the Kings' 23rd season in the National Hockey League. It saw the Kings compile a record of 34-39-7 for 75 points, good enough for fourth place in the Smythe Division. They defeated the defending Stanley Cup champion Calgary Flames in the first round of the playoffs before falling to the eventual Stanley Cup champion Edmonton Oilers in the second round. For the Kings, this was the second consecutive year that they eliminated the defending Stanley Cup champions in the first round of the playoffs, only to be swept in the following round by the eventual Cup champions. In both years, they involved both teams from the province of Alberta.

This season saw the Kings' captain, Wayne Gretzky, become the all-time leading scorer in NHL history (see below for more details). Gretzky also led the league in scoring for the year, winning the Art Ross Trophy.

Offseason

NHL Draft
Los Angeles's draft picks at the 1989 NHL Entry Draft held at the Met Center in Bloomington, Minnesota.

Regular season
Mario Gosselin was the first goaltender in NHL history to lose a game without giving up a goal. Gosselin filled in for Kelly Hrudey and the Kings would give up an empty net goal. The result was a 7-6 loss to the Edmonton Oilers.

On Wednesday, October 25, 1989, the Kings were shut out at home 5-0 by the Calgary Flames. It was the first time the team had been shut out in a regular-season game since Wednesday, March 12, 1986, when they lost at home 3-0 to the Detroit Red Wings. Prior to the loss against the Flames, the Kings had scored at least one goal in 261 consecutive regular-season games.

Wayne Gretzky's scoring record
On October 15, 1989, playing in only his 780th career game, Wayne Gretzky became the all-time leading scorer in NHL history, breaking the record of 1,850 career points set by his idol, Gordie Howe. Gretzky set the new record on a game-tying goal against Bill Ranford in the final minute of a contest against his former team, the Edmonton Oilers, in Edmonton. Afterwards, Howe was on hand to congratulate Gretzky on his accomplishment. The Kings went on to win the game in overtime.

Final standings

Schedule and results

Player statistics

Transactions
The Kings were involved in the following transactions during the 1989–90 season.

Trades

Free agent signings

Free agents lost

Free agent compensation

Waivers

Playoffs

Round 1: (S1) Calgary Flames vs. (S4) Los Angeles Kings

Round 2: (S2) Edmonton Oilers vs. (S4) Los Angeles Kings

Awards and honors
 Wayne Gretzky, Runner Up, Lady Byng Memorial Trophy

References
 Kings on Hockey Database

Los Angeles Kings seasons
Los
Los
LA Kings
LA Kings